Pachydiscidae is a family of middle and upper Cretaceous ammonites in the superfamily Desmoceratoidea.

Morphology
Pachydiscidae species are moderate to large in size, evolute to rather involute, and vary in section from inflated and depressed to high-whorled and compressed.  They are distinguished from the Desmoceratidae by strong ribbing at some growth stage, that normally crosses the venter uninterrupted, and by the tendency to develop strong tuberculation, at least on the umbilical shoulder.

Pachydischidae evolved from Desmoceratidea, during the Lower Cenomanian, about the same time as the Kossmaticeratidae, but lived further into the Maastrichtian, virtually to the end of the Cretaceous.

Genera
 Anapachydiscus Yabe and Shimizu, 1926
 Baskaniceras Wright and Kennedy, 1984
 Canadoceras Spath, 1922
 Eopachydiscus Wright, 1955
 Eupachydiscus Spath, 1922
 Lewesiceras Spath, 1939
 Menuites Spath, 1922
 Nowakites 
 Pachydiscus Zittel, 1884
 Urakawites Matsumoto, 1955

Distribution
Fossils of Pachydiscidae are found in the Cretaceous marine strata throughout the world, including Angola, Antarctica, Armenia, Australia, Austria, Belgium, Brazil, Bulgaria, Chile, Czech Republic, Denmark, France, Germany, Haiti, India, Jamaica, Japan, Mexico, Netherlands, Nigeria, Oman, Russia, South Africa, Spain, Turkey, United States and Uzbekistan.

References

 Mesozoic Ammonoidea. Treatise on Invertebrate Paleontology, Part L (1957), p L377-L380. Geological Society of America.
 Paleobiology Database

Desmoceratoidea
Ammonitida families
Cenomanian first appearances
Maastrichtian extinctions